The Puente de Boyacá (in English: Bridge of Boyacá) is a small bridge located at the Pan-American Highway, 110 km east of Bogotá and 14 km west from Tunja in a valley, crossing Teatinos River.  Numerous monuments have been erected in the surroundings to commemorate the historic battle of August 7, 1819, known as the Battle of Boyacá, which granted independence to New Granada.

The bridge was built in the early 18th century, and was dedicated as National Monument and Memorial of Independence in 1920.

Commemorative monuments
Near the bridge are located the following secondary monuments: 

 The Von Miller Monument (for German sculptor Ferdinand Freiherr von Miller), depicting five allegoric female figures (symbolic of the Bolivarian countries: Colombia, Venezuela, Peru, Ecuador and Bolivia) surrounding Simón Bolívar.
 The Francisco de Paula Santander statue.
 The Triumphal Arch, depicting the three main races (Caucasian, African and Native American) that combined into the Colombian ethnic mix.    
 The Flags Square, with the Liberty Fire; a perpetual gas-ignited flame.  
 The Chapel, with four daily masses.

References
 (Spanish) https://web.archive.org/web/20110707053547/http://www.tunja.gov.co/?idcategoria=3010

Boyaca
Buildings and structures in Boyacá Department
Landmarks in Colombia
Monuments and memorials in Colombia
Monuments of Colombia